Etmopterus burgessi, sometimes known as the broad-snout lanternshark, is a lanternshark of the family Etmopteridae in the order Squaliformes.  It is found only around Taiwan.

Etymology
The shark is named in honor of George H. Burgess of the Florida Museum of Natural History, in thanks to his contributions to the systematics of Etmopterus.

References

 

Etmopterus
Taxa named by Jayna Ann Schaaf-Da Silva
Taxa named by David A. Ebert
Fish described in 2006